Chennai Central–Jaipur Superfast Express is a Superfast Express bi-weekly train run by Indian Railways connecting Capital of Tamil Nadu Chennai Central with Rajasthan's Capital Jaipur with train numbers 12967/12968. It runs with highly refurbished LHB coaches from January 2021.

Service and schedule
The train departs Jaipur from every Fridays and Sundays at 19.35hrs to reach Chennai Central on every Sundays and Tuesdays at 08.20hrs.

Route and stations
This train passes through 30 intermediate stations including Sawai Madhopur, Kota, Nagda, Ujjain, Bhopal, Itarsi, Nagpur, Balharshah, Warangal, Vijayawada and Gudur

Coach and rake
It has totally 22 LHB coaches.

 1 AC First Class Cum AC Two Tier, 
 2 AC Two Tier
 6 AC Three Tier
 6 Sleeper Class
 1 Pantry Car
 4 General Unreserved
 2 Generator Cars

It shares its rakes with

1. Jaipur - Coimbatore Superfast Express

2. Jaipur - Mysuru Superfast Express

The train is pulled by Erode WAP-4, Royapuram WAP-7 Lallaguda WAP-4 and Abu Road WDM-3A.

References

External links
 12967 Time Table
 12968 Time Table

Transport in Chennai
Transport in Jaipur
Railway services introduced in 1998
Rail transport in Tamil Nadu
Express trains in India
Rail transport in Andhra Pradesh
Rail transport in Madhya Pradesh
Rail transport in Telangana
Rail transport in Rajasthan
Rail transport in Maharashtra